Mattie Lubchansky is a cartoonist and illustrator from the United States, who specializes in satirical comics about American politics. Lubchansky is non-binary and uses they/them pronouns since 2017.

Lubchansky has published comic strips in The Nib, where they are associate editor, as well as on other sites such as Current Affairs, The Daily Dot and Jewish Currents.

Their work is mostly short strips (with four panels), and their editorial work focuses mainly on strips as well. They were a finalist for the 2020 Herblock Prize. Their 2021 book The Antifa Super Soldier Cookbook spoofs right-wing conspiracy theories about Antifa activists in the United States. A review in Fast Company said Lubchansky "may have created the definitive piece of satire about the conservative mindset." In 2022, Print magazine declared Lubchansky one of five political cartoonists to follow on Instagram, writing, "They love to play with surreal, sci fi-inspired concepts, and have a knack for making dystopia feel at least a little funny."

Lubchansky first studied engineering and worked in construction before becoming a cartoonist.

The font used in their comics is inspired by their handwriting and is called "Lubhand".

Publications 
In addition to their comics strips, mostly published on The Nib, Lubchansky has been writing a webcomic, Please Listen To Me, since 2010.

They have written or illustrated several books as well:

 Dad Magazine, co-authored with Jaya Saxena (Quirk, 2016) 
 Skeleton Party (self-published, 2016)
 The Antifa Super Soldier Cookbook (Silver Sprocket, 2021) 
 Flash Forward: An Illustrated Guide to Possible (And Not So Possible) Tomorrows, co-written with Rose Eveleth and Sophie Goldstein (Abrams Books, 2021) 
 Boys' Weekend (Pantheon, 2023)

References

External links 

 Please Listen to Me  - A comic by Matt Lubchansky

American cartoonists
Living people
Year of birth missing (living people)
Non-binary artists